The Medicine Hat City Council is the governing body for the city of Medicine Hat, Alberta, Canada. The council consists of the mayor and eight councillors.

Current Medicine Hat City Council 
Linnsie Clark, mayor
Robert Dumanowski, councillor
Cassi Hider, councillor
Darren Hirsch, councillor
Allison Knodel, councillor
Andy McGrogan, councillor
Ramona Robins, councillor
Shila Sharps, councillor
Alison Van Dyke, councillor

References 

Municipal councils in Alberta
Politics of Medicine Hat